The Cost Accrual Ratio for a business is the total average cost per person per unit time, e.g. average cost per day per person. It is only useful for risk assessment in small projects where average wages are roughly equal.

References

Financial ratios
Corporate development